The 1990 France rugby union tour of Australia was a series of matches played in June 1990 in Australia by France national rugby union team

Matches
Scores and results list France's points tally first.

France national rugby union team tours
Rugby union tours of Australia
History of rugby union matches between Australia and France
France rugby union tour of Australia
France rugby union tour of Australia
France rugby union tour of Australia